"Lyin' in His Arms Again" is a song written by Terry Skinner and J. L. Wallace, and recorded by American country music group The Forester Sisters.  It was released in October 1987 as the third single from the album You Again.  The song reached number 5 on the Billboard Hot Country Singles & Tracks chart.

Charts

Weekly charts

Year-end charts

References

1988 singles
1987 songs
The Forester Sisters songs
Warner Records singles
Songs written by Terry Skinner
Songs written by J. L. Wallace